Thought and Action is a 1959 book about action theory by the philosopher Stuart Hampshire. The book has received praise from commentators, and is considered Hampshire's major work.

Summary

Hampshire discusses contrasts such as those between the necessary and the contingent, between thought and behaviour, between situations and responses to them, between criticism and practice, and between abstract philosophy and experience. He argues that empiricist theories of perception descending from the philosophers George Berkeley and David Hume mistakenly represent people as passive observers receiving impressions from "outside" of the mind, where the "outside" includes their own bodies.

Publication history
Thought and Action was first published by Chatto and Windus in 1959.

Reception
The historian Peter Gay wrote that Thought and Action is a "brilliant" and "lucid" contribution to the philosophy of action, and a subtle vindication of free will. The philosopher Roger Scruton credited Hampshire with providing a seminal discussion of two contrasting outlooks on the future that can be called "predicting and deciding". The philosopher R. S. Downie described Thought and Action as Hampshire's major work, while the philosopher Anthony Quinton wrote that Hampshire's "systematic aim and fine mandarin prose were both unusual for an Oxford philosopher of the time."

References

Bibliography
Books

 
 
 
 
 

1959 non-fiction books
Books by Stuart Hampshire
Chatto & Windus books
Contemporary philosophical literature
English-language books
English non-fiction books
Philosophy of mind literature